Events from the year 1629 in Denmark.

Incumbents 
 Monarch – Christian IV

Events
 22 May – Christian IV signs the Treaty of Lübeck, bringing an end to Denmark's intervention in the Thirty Years' War.
 25 July  The County of Christiansborg (from 1741: The County of Christianssæde) is established by Christian Detlev Reventlow from the manors f Christianssæde, Ålstrup, Skelstofte and Pederstrup as well as the farm (parcelgård) Frihedsminde.

Undated
 A fire destroys much of Kronborg Castle but it is subsequently rebuilt.
 Bech's Windmill is constructed in Svaneke on Bornholm.

Births
 7 May – Niels Juel, naval officer (died 1697)
 1 September – Dorothea Elisabeth Christiansdatter, daughter of Christian IV and catholic nun (died 1687 in Germany)

Full date missing
 Jens Foss, physician (died 1687)

Deaths 
 13 July – Caspar Bartholin the Elder, scientist (born 1585)

Full date missing
 Kirsten Madsdatter, royal mistress

References 

 
Denmark
Years of the 17th century in Denmark